The  SandAce - British Championship was an Auto-Cycle Union Motorcycle championship which was run and organised by the Guernsey Motor Cycle & Car Club LBG. It was first run in 2006 as the Guernsey SandAce and became the  SandAce - British Championship in 2012.

In 2019, after achieving International status, members of the Guernsey Motor Cycle & Car Club LBG unbelievably voted to scrap the SandAce championship to concentrate purely on local club meetings featuring motocross bikes, cars and just a few Track Racing bikes, killing off the concept of a national or International meeting.

The Championship was one of many motor sport events that take place on the island and the Channel Islands as a whole. It took place annually and was run at Vazon Beach on the west coast of the island. Guernsey Sand Racing has been going on since the 1920s. Today the Guernsey Championship is run between April and September and there are two, three four wheeled championships.

SandAce - British Championship Classes
There are two championship classes. They are up to 500 cc Solo machines and up to 1000 cc Right-hand Sidecars. The Sidecars were included with the introduction of the British Championship.

International
There is very much an international flavor to the meeting, competitors from Australia, Denmark, France and Germany have all taken part.

Main Sponsor
The main sponsor was Condor Ferries.

Solo Medalists

Sidecars Medalists

Results by rider

Solos

Sidecars

Sidecars

References

Motorcycling events
Motorsport competitions in the United Kingdom
Sport in the Channel Islands
Sports competitions in Guernsey